Santa Rita d'Oeste is a municipality in the state of São Paulo in Brazil. The population is 2,487 (2020 est.) in an area of 210 km². The elevation is 400 m.

References

Municipalities in São Paulo (state)